William Thomas Rudd (born 13 December 1941) is an English former footballer who made 574 appearances in the Football League playing for Birmingham City, York City, Grimsby Town, Rochdale and Bury.

References

1941 births
Living people
Footballers from Manchester
English footballers
Association football midfielders
Stalybridge Celtic F.C. players
Birmingham City F.C. players
York City F.C. players
Grimsby Town F.C. players
Rochdale A.F.C. players
Bury F.C. players
Cork Hibernians F.C. players
English Football League players
League of Ireland players